Alan Young is a former Australian rules footballer who played for the Collingwood Football Club in the Victorian Football League (VFL).

Notes

External links 

Living people
1933 births
Australian rules footballers from Victoria (Australia)
Collingwood Football Club players
Ararat Football Club players